Ikaroa-Rāwhiti is a New Zealand parliamentary Māori electorate.

Population centres

As the electorate's name suggests (ika "fish", roa "long", rāwhiti "east"), Ikaroa-Rāwhiti is a long electorate covering the eastern North Island (Te Ika-a-Māui).

The electorate includes the following population centres (from north to south):
 Gisborne
 Wairoa
 Napier
 Hastings
 Central Hawke's Bay
 Tararua District
 Masterton and the Wairarapa district
 Upper Hutt
 Lower Hutt—northern suburbs (north of Fairway Drive and Daysh Street), western hills (excluding Korokoro), and Wainuiomata

In the 2013/14 redistribution, a minor boundary adjustment was undertaken. A small area, including the village of Tuia, was transferred to the  electorate.

Tribal areas

The electorate includes the following tribal areas:
 Ngāti Porou – Potikirua ki Te Toka-a-Taiau (Gisborne)
 Te Aitanga-a-Māhaki – Gisborne and Poverty Bay
 Rongowhakaata – Poverty Bay
 Ngāi Tāmanuhiri – Poverty Bay
 Ngāti Kahungunu – Wairoa, Hawke's Bay, Hastings, Napier and Wairarapa
 Ngāti Toa – Hutt Valley, and northern Lower Hutt

History
Horomia's death on 29 April 2013 triggered a by-election, which was held on 29 June and won by Labour's Meka Whaitiri. The Māori Party had nominated tribal leader Na Rongowhakaata Raihania. and the Mana Party had selected television presenter Te Hamua Nikora as its candidate. The Green Party had selected environmentalist and human rights advocate Marama Davidson. Further candidates had been Michael Appleby for the Aotearoa Legalise Cannabis Party plus two independent candidates. Based on preliminary results, Whaitiri more than tripled her  night majority over Mana's Nikora. Also based on preliminary results, Marama Fox of the Māori Party was elected to Parliament as a list MP.

Members of Parliament
Key

List MPs
Members of Parliament elected from party lists in elections where that person also unsuccessfully contested Ikaroa-Rāwhiti. Unless otherwise stated, all MPs terms began and ended at general elections.

Election results

2020 election

2017 election

2014 election

2013 by-election

2011 election

Electorate (as at 26 November 2011): 32,951

2008 election

2005 election

1999 election

|}

Notes

References

External links
Electorate Profile   Parliamentary Library

Māori electorates
1999 establishments in New Zealand